Volksstaat or Volkstaat may refer to:

 Volksstaat, a German word meaning "people's state" or "republic" that may refer to the following:
 Volksstaat Hessen (People's State of Hesse), official name of Hesse from 1918 until the end of World War II
 Freier Volksstaat Württemberg (Free People's State of Württemberg), German state of the Weimar Republic
 Volksstaat Bayern, name given to Bavaria for short period of 1919
 Volksstaat Reuß, name given to a part of Thuringia before its integration into the new land of Thuringia in 1920
 Der Volksstaat, a newspaper of the Social Democratic Workers Party in Germany in the late 19th century
 Volkstaat, a proposed Afrikaner state in South Africa